The 2022–23 Montana State Bobcats men's basketball team represented Montana State University in the Big Sky Conference during the 2022–23 NCAA Division I men's basketball season. Led by fourth-year head coach Danny Sprinkle, the Bobcats played their home games on campus at Brick Breeden Fieldhouse in Bozeman, Montana. They finished the regular season at 22–9 (15–3 in Big Sky, second).

In the conference tournament, MSU defeated Northern Colorado, Weber State, and Northern Arizona to successfully defend their tournament title and make consecutive appearances in the NCAA tournament. Seeded fourteenth in the East region, the Bobcats were defeated by twelve points in the first round by fifteenth-ranked Kansas State and finished at 25–10 overall.

Previous season
Montana State finished the 2021–22 regular season at 24–7 (16–4 in Big Sky, first). As the top seed in the conference tournament, they defeated Sacramento State, Weber State, and Northern Colorado to win the title and earn the Big Sky's automatic bid to the NCAA tournament.

This was MSU's first appearance in the NCAA tournament in in 26 years. Seeded fourteenth in the West region, the Bobcats were defeated by twelfth-ranked Texas Tech in the first round and finished at 27–8 overall.

Roster

Schedule and results

|-
!colspan=12 style=| Exhibition

|-
!colspan=12 style=| Regular season

|-
!colspan=12 style=""| Big Sky regular season

|-
!colspan=12 style=| 

|-
!colspan=12 style=}| NCAA tournament

Source

References

Montana State Bobcats men's basketball seasons
Montana State Bobcats
Montana State Bobcats men's basketball
Montana State